The 1950 United States elections were held on November 7, 1950, and elected the members of the 82nd United States Congress. The election took place during the Korean War, during Democratic President Harry S. Truman's second (only full) term. The Democrats lost twenty-eight seats to the Republican Party in the House of Representatives. The Democrats also lost five seats in the U.S. Senate to the Republicans. The defeat of the Labor Party congressman Vito Marcantonio  left third parties without representation in Congress for the first time since 1908.

Like his predecessor Franklin D. Roosevelt in 1938, Truman and the Democratic party managed to maintain control of both houses, defying the six-year itch phenomenon for the second time in a row. However, the election was still a defeat for Truman, as it strengthened the conservative coalition and ensured that none of Truman's Fair Deal policies would pass. Republicans also ran against Truman's prosecution of the Korean War, and the 82nd Congress subsequently conducted numerous investigations into the course of the war. The election set the stage for the presidency of Republican Dwight D. Eisenhower and the centrist policies of the 1950s.

See also
1950 United States House of Representatives elections
1950 United States Senate elections
1950 United States gubernatorial elections

References

 
1950
United States midterm elections
November 1950 events in the United States